The REVA Armoured Personnel Carrier (APC) is a mine-protected vehicle. It is produced by Integrated Convoy Protection. The vehicle’s V-shaped hull offers protection against land mines and Improvised Explosive Devices (IED)s. The vehicle has space for at least 10 passengers. Ten firing ports are also available. Two light machine guns can be used and cover a 360-degree on roller bearing turret hatches.

The vehicle is often confused with the Mamba and the RG-31.

Production history

Variants
The REVA 4x4 APC is available as a 10-seater vehicle which includes the driver and co-driver.  It was designed in October 2004. ICP are the owners of the Blue Print data pack of the REVA 4x4.

Other models available are:
 A command and control vehicle
 An ambulance
 A recovery vehicle
 A VIP carrier

Operators

Current operators
: Used by the Rapid Deployment Forces (Egypt)
: 25
: 115
 : 40 
: 25
: 10
: 87 
: 112

Combat history
Boko Haram insurgency
Iraq War
Iraqi insurgency (2011–2013)
South Sudanese Civil War

See also
Other wheeled APCs and IFVs developed in South Africa
RG-33
RG-32
RG-12
Mamba
Puma (South African, new construction by Regis Trading International (Pty) Ltd , which is similar to the Mamba
Ratel IFV
Casspir
Buffel
General
Infantry fighting vehicle
List of AFVs

References

External links
 Integrated Convoy Protection

Armoured personnel carriers of South Africa
Wheeled armoured personnel carriers